Gold plan may refer to:
 An offering of the United States' Patient Protection and Affordable Care Act defined as covering 80 percent of out-of-pocket costs
 A collection of recipes by the Physicians Committee for Responsible Medicine
 A digital phone plan by Full Channel
 A dining plan on the Campus of Drexel University
 A meal plan offered by the College of Saint Rose
 An e-commerce plan formerly offered by IzzoNet
 An affiliation level launched in May 2009 by  NBCUniversal Television Group